Anisosticta is a genus of beetle of the family Coccinellidae.

Species
 Anisosticta bitriangularis (Say)
 Anisosticta borealis Timberlake, 1943
 Anisosticta novemdecimpunctata (Linnaeus, 1758)
 Anisosticta strigata (Thunberg, 1795)

External links
 Anisosticta at BioLib

Coccinellidae genera